Fit World Gorillák RC is a Hungarian rugby club in Szeged. They currently play in the Hungarian Extraliga. The club is sponsored by a gymnasium in the city by the name of Fit World, hence the name.

History
The club was re-established in 2004, but was founded in February 1993 by Jenő Palásti. 
The club won they first hungarian championship in 2022.

Historical names
 1993 - Mogorva Gorillák
 2004 - Fit World RC (Fit World Rugby Club)
 2009 - Fit World Gorillák RC (Fit World Gorillák Rugby Club)

2011 Season

Current squad

External links
  Fit World Gorillák RC
  Blog of Szegedrugby

Magunkról
GORILLÁK RUGBY
SZEGED, CSONGRÁD MEGYE, HUNGARY
Gorillák Rugby Club - a Fit World SE rögbiszakosztályában működő NB1-es szegedi rögbi csapat. --- Ahol megtalálsz bennünket: Szeged, Etelka sor - itt edzünk és játszuk mérkőzéseinket. Látogass ki, nézz meg bennünket! --- Mottó: A rögbi sportág szabályai, mozgásanyaga még kevésbé ismert a magyar sportéletben, mint más hagyományos sportágaké, pedig a focival egy tőröl ered. Ez a világszerte népszerű labdás küzdősport - ami egyben a csapatjátékok csúcsa - még keresi az őt megillető helyet a magyar fiatalok körében. Mi, akik elkötelezett hívei vagyunk ennek a kemény, férfias, ugyanakkor nagyon erős jellemformáló sportágnak, szeretnénk elérni, hogy a magyar fiatalok fizikai képzésében és szellemi nevelésében is nagyobb szerepet kapjon sportágunk. A főiskolák képzési választékában szerencsére már szerepel a rögbi... nálunk pedig gyakorolható is!! VÁRUNK!!

Hungarian rugby union teams
Rugby clubs established in 1993